A screw sloop is a propeller-driven sloop-of-war.  In the 19th century, during the introduction of the steam engine, ships driven by propellers were differentiated from those driven by paddle-wheels  by referring to the ship's screws (propellers).  Other propeller-driven warships included screw frigates and screw corvettes.

See also
CSS Alabama
USS Alaska
USS Contoocook
HMS Gannet, now a museum ship.
USS Housatonic, sunk by the first successful submarine attack.
USS Wyoming

Ship types